Helen Madeleine McKie (11 October 1889 – 28 February 1957) was a British artist and illustrator.

After leaving Lambeth School of Art, McKie became a member of staff to 'Bystander' magazine from 1915 to 1929. She was also a contributing artist to The Graphic, Sphere, Autocar, and Queen publications.

She illustrated books, created mural designs, and painted the artwork for posters. Her most famous works are the pair posters "Waterloo Station – War" and "Waterloo Station – Peace" which were published by Southern Railway in 1948 to celebrate the centenary of Waterloo station.

During the First World War, a lot of her drawings focused on the war effort. After the war, she sketched scenes taking place at London nightclubs.

References

External links
 
 V&A Archive of Art and Design: Helen McKie, artist and illustrator: papers, 1889–2004

1889 births
1957 deaths
20th-century British women artists
British illustrators